is an action video game for the Nintendo Family Computer. This video game is the home conversion of Nichibutsu's arcade game, that was originally supposed to be named Booby Kids.

In 1993, Nichibutsu released for the Game Boy a similar game entitled Booby Boys.

Gameplay

Booby Kids is a game played from an overhead perspective, with the player taking on the role of one of the titular Booby Kids, named for their ability to instantly dig booby traps in front of where they stand and bury hostile enemies that attempt to seek out and ultimately destroy the Booby Kids. Compared to Kid no Hore Hore Daisakusen, the levels in Booby Kids feature more of a reliance on puzzle-solving in addition to the maze like structures of the original game.

Levels range from the conventional prehistory setting of the first four levels to feudal Japan and even some futuristic levels inspired by science fiction. There are 21 levels in this game with five different bonus levels to gain extra points in. Objects to acquire in the other time zones include coconuts (in the prehistoric era), ancient Japanese scrolls (in feudal Japan), radios (in the World War II era), bags of money (in the modern era), and computer monitors (retrieved in the future era).

See also
Cratermaze

References

External links
Booby Kids at GameFAQs

1987 video games
Action video games
Japan-exclusive video games
Nihon Bussan games
Nintendo Entertainment System games
Nintendo Switch games
PlayStation 4 games
Video games about time travel
Top-down video games
Video games developed in Japan

Hamster Corporation games